Apriona rugicollis is a species of beetle in the family Cerambycidae. It was described by Chevrolat in 1852. It is known from China, Cambodia, Japan, Taiwan, North Korea, South Korea, and Vietnam.

Subspecies
 Apriona rugicollis nobuoi Breuning & Ohbayashi, 1966
 Apriona rugicollis rugicollis Chevrolat, 1852
 Apriona rugicollis yayeyamai Breuning, 1976

References

Batocerini
Beetles described in 1852